The 1956 Montana Grizzlies football team represented the University of Montana in the 1956 NCAA University Division football season as a member of the Skyline Conference. The Grizzlies were led by second-year head coach Jerry Williams, played their home games at Dornblaser Field and finished the season with a record of one win and nine losses (1–9, 1–6 Skyline).

Schedule

References

Montana
Montana Grizzlies football seasons
Montana Grizzlies football